Iva Knapová-Kalibánová-Kusynová (born 2 July 1960) is an orienteering competitor who competed for Czechoslovakia. She won a silver medal in the relay at the 1983 World Orienteering Championships in Zalaegerszeg, together with Eva Bártová, Jana Hlaváčová and Ada Kuchařová. At the 1987 World Orienteering Championships in Gérardmer she won a bronze medal in the relay with the Czechoslovak team, which in addition to Kalibanová consisted of Iva Slaninová, Ada Kuchařová and Jana Galíková.

References

1960 births
Living people
Czechoslovak orienteers
Czech orienteers
Female orienteers
Foot orienteers
World Orienteering Championships medalists